In algebraic geometry, a reflexive sheaf is a coherent sheaf that is isomorphic to its second dual (as a sheaf of modules) via the canonical map. The second dual of a coherent sheaf is called the reflexive hull of the sheaf. A basic example of a reflexive sheaf is a locally free sheaf of finite rank and, in practice, a reflexive sheaf is thought of as a kind of a vector bundle modulo some singularity. The notion is important both in scheme theory and complex algebraic geometry.

For the theory of reflexive sheaves, one works over an integral noetherian scheme.

A reflexive sheaf is torsion-free. The dual of a coherent sheaf is reflexive. Usually, the product of reflexive sheaves is defined as the reflexive hull of their tensor products (so the result is reflexive.)

A coherent sheaf F is said to be "normal" in the sense of Barth if the restriction  is bijective for every open subset U and a closed subset Y of U of codimension at least 2. With this terminology, a coherent sheaf on an integral normal scheme is reflexive if and only if it is torsion-free and normal in the sense of Barth. A reflexive sheaf of rank one on an integral locally factorial scheme is invertible.

A divisorial sheaf on a scheme X is a rank-one reflexive sheaf that is locally free at the generic points of the conductor DX of X. For example, a canonical sheaf (dualizing sheaf) on a normal projective variety is a divisorial sheaf.

See also 
Torsionless module
Torsion sheaf
Twisted sheaf

Notes

References

Further reading

External links 
Reflexive sheaves on singular surfaces
Push-forward of locally free sheaves
http://www-personal.umich.edu/~kschwede/GeneralizedDivisors.pdf

Sheaf theory